Bakaiku is a town and municipality located in the province and autonomous community of Navarre, northern Spain. It has 359 inhabitants and is an average 515 m above mean sea level.

References

External links
 BAKAIKU in the Bernardo Estornés Lasa - Auñamendi Encyclopedia (Euskomedia Fundazioa) 
 Bakaiku, pueblos of Spain

fiestas
Viva las fiestas de Iturmendi.

Municipalities in Navarre